The Barra Isles, also known as the Bishop's Isles, are a small archipelago in the Outer Hebrides of Scotland. They lie south of the island of Barra, for which they are named. The group consists of nine islands and numerous rocky islets, skerries, and sea stacks.

In 1427, the Lords of the Isles awarded Lairdship of Barra (and its associated islands) to Clan MacNeil of Barra. However, following acts of piracy by the MacNeils, king James VI transferred ownership of the southern archipelago to the Bishop of the Isles, hence the islands became known as the Bishop's Isles. Murray writes that they belonged "to the Bishop of the Isles de jure although to MacNeil de facto".

Many of the islands are extremely small; only the largest, Vatersay – which is now linked by causeway to Barra – remains inhabited. Berneray (also known as Barra Head), Pabbay, Sandray and Mingulay have been inhabited in the past. The four smallest islands are Flodday, Lingay, Muldoanich and Uineasan.

Access to these islands can be arranged with Barra Fishing Charters , who run regular trips to Mingulay from May to September and visit other islands by arrangement.

The Barra Isles are featured in several Viking sagas.

In addition to the larger islands thare are various smaller islets, stacks and skerries. Biruaslum is a stack to the west of Vatersay.  It reaches  in height and there is a ruined prehistoric fort on the southern side. Francis G. Thompson characterizes it as "high and virtually inaccessible";  James Fisher mentions a "fulmar flying up and down its tiny cliff."

Notes

References

 
Clan MacNeil